Richard Ackerman may refer to:

 Dick Ackerman (born 1942), California State Senator
 Richard Henry Ackerman (1903–1992), American prelate of the Roman Catholic Church